Airdrie Hallcraig Street railway station served the town of Airdrie, North Lanarkshire, Scotland from 1844 to 1871 on the Hallcraig Street branch.

History 
The station opened on 26 December 1844 by the North British Railway. It closed on 1 June 1871 but remained open as a goods station until 1964. Nothing remains today.

References

External links 

Disused railway stations in North Lanarkshire
Former North British Railway stations
Railway stations in Great Britain opened in 1844
Railway stations in Great Britain closed in 1871
1844 establishments in Scotland
1871 disestablishments in Scotland